Ossetian  may refer to:

 A person or thing from the region of Ossetia in the Caucasus
 Ossetian language, an eastern Iranian language
 Ossetian people, speakers of the language
 North Ossetia-Alania, federal administrative division of Russia
 South Ossetia, a breakaway state of Georgia with limited recognition

See also
 Alania (disambiguation)

Language and nationality disambiguation pages